Santi Ibáñez (15 March 1958 – 29 December 2016), born in Barcelona, was a popular Spanish Catalan actor of cinema, theater and television, known for his role as Beni in El cor de la ciutat and his appearances in Temps de silenci, Estació d'enllaç, Plats Bruts, Cuéntame cómo pasó and films like Anita no perd el tren, by Ventura Pons.

Began in the world of theater with the help of Albert Boadella, with the company "Els Joglars", and worked in other companies such as "La Cubana", under the direction of directors like Sergi Belbel.

He died on 29 December 2016, due to lung cancer.

References

External links 
 Santi Ibáñez in IMDb
 Santi Ibáñez  in Teatralnet

1958 births
2016 deaths
20th-century Spanish male actors
21st-century Spanish male actors
Male film actors from Catalonia
Male television actors from Catalonia
Male stage actors from Catalonia
Spanish male film actors
Spanish male stage actors
Spanish male television actors
Male actors from Barcelona
Deaths from lung cancer